Colin MacLeod or McLeod may refer to:

 Colin Munro MacLeod (1909–1972), Canadian-American geneticist
 Colin William MacLeod (1943–1981), British classical scholar, educator and author
 Colin McLeod (engineer) (1921–2018), New Zealand civil engineer
 Colin Murdo Macleod (1966–2005), founder of GalGael Trust
 Colin MacLeod, the lead character of Highlander: The Search for Vengeance